Samuel Eliot (1821–1898) was an American historian and educator.

Samuel Eliot may also refer to:

 Samuel A. Eliot (minister) (1862–1950), American Unitarian clergyman
 Samuel Atkins Eliot (politician) (1798–1862), U.S. Representative from Massachusetts
 Samuel Atkins Eliot Jr. (1893–1984), American author
 Samuel Eliot (banker) (1739–1820), American merchant and banker

See also
Sam Elliott (born 1944), American actor
Samuel Eliot Morison (1887–1976), American historian, author and naval officer
Samuel Elliott Hoskins (1799–1888), physician